Bikash Bhattacharjee (21 June 1940 – 18 December 2006) was an Indian painter from Kolkata in West Bengal. Through his paintings, he depicted the life of the average middle-class Bengali – their aspirations, superstitions, hypocrisy and corruption, and even the violence that is endemic to Kolkata. He worked in oils, acrylics, water-colours, conté and collage. In 2003, he was awarded the highest award of Lalit Kala Akademi, India's National Academy of Arts, the Lalit Kala Akademi Fellowship.

Early life
Bhattacharjee was born in Kolkata 1940. At a very early age he lost his father. The consequent struggle for survival left him with a deep sense of insecurity as well as an empathy for the under-privileged, who often feature in his works.

In 1963, he graduated with a Diploma in Fine Arts from Indian College of Art and Draftsmanship.<ref>Forty Masterpieces: The Masterpieces and Museum-Quality Series, by Neville Tuli. Publisher, Osian's, 2006. , Page 197.</ref>

Bikash lived in Kolkata all his life.

Teaching career
Bhattacharjee taught at Indian College of Art and Draftsmanship from 1968 to 1972. He taught at the Government College of Art & Craft, Kolkata from 1973 to 1982. In 1964, he became a member of the Society of Contemporary Artists.

Painting career
His first solo exhibition was at Kolkata in 1965. His paintings were exhibited outside India; he had shows in 1969 at Paris; between 1970 and 72 in Yugoslavia, Czechoslovakia, Romania and Hungary; in London in 1982; and in New York in 1985.

He achieved commercial success early in life with his Doll Series in the 1960s, which was later followed by the Durga Series. In the 1980s, Bhttacharjee painted illustrations for a novel on the life of Ram Kinker Baij, a great artist of the past. The novel, written by Bengali novelist Samaresh Basu, was never completed because of the death of the author, but Bhttacharjee's works for the book were some of his best.

Bhttacharjee often painted in a realistic style. He painted portraits of Tagore, Satyajit Ray, and Samaresh Basu. His portrait of Indira Gandhi, with a blurred and white face, was painted after her murder. He produced a series of works about the Naxal movement and a group of paintings of prostitutes.

Bikash had inspired a host of painters in India including Sanjay Bhattacharya, a realistic painter from Bengal.

Style
Bikash Bhattacharya is credited with bringing realism back to Indian art at a time when artists in India were leaning more towards distortion of figures and abstraction.

Besides painting the city and its people that he knew so well, Bhattacharjee was an accomplished portrait painter. Realism was Bhattacharjee's forte; his oil paintings could depict the exact quality of drapery or the skin tone of a woman. He achieved mastery in capturing the quality of light.

Bhattacharjee achieved an enigmatic quality in his paintings that works on many levels from the visual to the subconscious. Subject matter included depictions of the female form, and people of all ages and situations—old men and women, children, domestic help. He had the ability to create an authentic milieu as a background to the characters to heighten the drama.

Bikash had been deeply influenced by the surrealists, and stated that Salvador Dalí was his favourite painter.

Personal life

In 2000, Bhattacharjee suffered a paralytic stroke that left him paralysed and unable to paint. He died in a Kolkata nursing home on 18 December 2006 following a prolonged illness. He was survived by his wife Parbati, a son, and a daughter.

Galleries
His paintings can be found in the following galleries:
 National Gallery of Modern Art, New Delhi
 Lalit Kala Akademi, New Delhi
 Ministry of Education, New Delhi
 Chandigarh University Museum, Chandigarh
 Bharat Bhavan, Bhopal

Awards and honours
 Academy of Fine Arts Award, Calcutta (1962)
 National Award, Lalit Kala Akademi, New Delhi (1971)
 Birla Academy of Art and Culture, Calcutta, National Award, Lalit Kala Akademi, New Delhi (1972)
 Banga Ratna (1987)
 Padma Shri (1988)
 Shiromani Purashkar (1989)
 Nivedita Purashkar, Ramkrishna Vivekananda Ashram (1990)
 Lalit Kala Akademi Fellowship (2003)

References

 Majumadāra, Manasija.  Close to Events: Works of Bikash Bhattacharjee''. Niyogi Books, 2007. .

External links and references
 Profile on Google Arts & Culture
 Documentary by Doordarshan on YouTube (in English and Hindi)
 Interview about his paintings on YouTube (in Bengali)
 https://web.archive.org/web/20080924195417/http://www.contemporaryindianart.com/bikash_bhattacharjee.htm
 https://web.archive.org/web/20081104062053/http://www.21stcenturyindianart.com/Realism.htm

Indian male painters

Realist painters
1940 births
2006 deaths
Artists from Kolkata
Recipients of the Padma Shri in arts
Fellows of the Lalit Kala Akademi
Academic staff of the University of Calcutta
Indian portrait painters
20th-century Indian painters
Painters from West Bengal
20th-century Indian male artists